Thuja standishii (Japanese thuja; Japanese:) is a species of thuja, an evergreen coniferous tree in the cypress family Cupressaceae. It is native to southern Japan, where it occurs on the islands of Honshū and Shikoku. It is a medium-sized tree, reaching 20–35 m tall and with a trunk up to 1 m diameter.

The foliage forms in flat sprays with scale-like leaves 2–4 mm long, matte green above, and with narrow white stomatal bands below. The cones are oval, yellow-green ripening red-brown, 6–12 mm long and 4–5 mm broad (opening to 8 mm broad), with 6–10 overlapping scales.

It is an important timber tree in Japan, grown in forestry plantations for its durable, waterproof, attractively scented wood.

There is some evidence that extracts of T. standishii have biological activity. It contains a compound called standishinal which has shown relatively potent effects on the enzyme aromatase. It acts as an inhibitor, thus decreasing the synthesis of estradiol in the human body. This compound has been used in research and derivatives of it have shown even stronger inhibition of aromatase.

References

Further reading

External links
Gymnosperm Database - Thuja standishii

standishii
Endemic flora of Japan
Trees of Japan
Five sacred trees of Kiso
Least concern plants
Least concern biota of Asia